Hendrik Barnard (born 4 August 1964) is a South African cricketer. He played in 14 first-class and 25 List A matches for Boland from 1989/90 to 1993/94.

See also
 List of Boland representative cricketers

References

External links
 

1964 births
Living people
South African cricketers
Boland cricketers
Cricketers from Cape Town